This is a consolidated list of castles and palaces in Norway. The Norwegian word slott means castle, palass means palace, and fort or festning means fortress. To see list of fortresses in Norway, see List of Norwegian fortresses. In Norway there tend to be many more manor houses compared to castles.

List of castles in medieval kingdom of Norway (borger)

Castles

Manors (Herregård/Setegård) and Mansions (Lystgård)

City Palé

See also 
 List of Norwegian fortresses

Norway

Castles
Norway
Castles